Pisogne is a comune of 8156 inhabitants in the province of Brescia, in Lombardy, Italy.

Geography
Pisogne is situated at the northern-east tip of Lake Iseo, where the river Oglio flows into the lake. It is the lowermost commune of the Val Camonica. Neighbouring communes are Marone, Pezzaze, Pian Camuno and Costa Volpino.

History

Pisogne is mentioned for the first time in 1227.

In 1287 the great rebellion led by Camunian Federici noble family against the city of Brescia, was followed by the killing of several of Pisogne Guelphs resident there. Following this fact, the town was fortified between the 12th and 13th century and granted to the  Brusati family.

In 1518 eight witches were convicted of arson in Pisogne.

On November 14, 1727, the bandit Giorgio Vicario, one of the most feared of Val Camonica "buli" (bandits), born in Pisogne in 1695, was murdered.

In 1907 Pisogne was reached by the railway line, which is still running.

Main sights

 The Church of Santa Maria della Neve, containing frescoes by Romanino
 The ancient parish church of Santa Maria in Silvis, built around the 9th century on ancient Roman remains, still partly visible.
 The parish church dedicated to Santa Maria Assunta, dating to the 18th century.
 The Bishop's Tower, located in the main square (12th century)

People
Bishop Giacomo Maria Corna Pellegrini

International relations

Twin towns – Sister cities
Pisogne is twinned with:
 Konstancin-Jeziorna, Poland (since 1991)

References

Sources

External links

 Historical photos - Intercam
 Historical photos - Lombardia Beni Culturali

Cities and towns in Lombardy